The Kincardine Line is a railway in Clackmannanshire and Fife, Scotland. It was originally built to serve settlements along the north shore of the Firth of Forth, between Alloa and Dunfermline.

It was opened in two stages by the North British Railway: from Alloa to Kincardine in 1893, and the eastern section in 1903. Passenger traffic was disappointing, and closed in 1930. Goods traffic was poorly used as well, that is until in 1962, when a large coal-fired power station opened on the line. A second followed, and the entire line was re-opened in stages to bring in coal for the power station requirements. The power stations were decommissioned in 2016, bringing heavy mineral traffic to an end. There is a possibility of re-opening to passenger trains on the route.

First railways
During the promotion of railways in 1845 that resulted in the major expansion of the Scottish railway network, the Scottish Central Railway was authorised to build from Castlecary, on the Edinburgh and Glasgow Railway, to Perth through Stirling. On the eastern side, the Edinburgh and Northern Railway was authorised to build from Burntisland to Perth and Tayport, for Dundee. The Edinburgh and Northern also obtained permission to build a branch line from Thornton to Dunfermline.

The following year, 1846, saw the authorisation of the Stirling and Dunfermline Railway, running through Alloa. All these lines were substantially complete by 1849. The Stirling and Dunfermline Railway had a Clackmannan station and a Kincardine station, but both those places were some considerable distance from the railway. The attraction of Dunfermline as a railway objective was the mineral resources, especially coal in the Dunfermline coalfield.

Early proposals
Kincardine had long had importance as a ferry crossing of the Forth, and in 1888 the North British Railway proposed a line connecting a junction near Clackmannan station with Kincardine, as well as acquisition of the ferry. However this was a low priority for the NBR at that time, and the idea came to nothing.

Alloa to Kincardine
By 1865, both the Edinburgh and Northern Railway and the Stirling and Dunfermline Railway had become part of the North British Railway, while the Scottish Central Railway had become a part of the rival Caledonian Railway. The Caledonian had a dense network of railways in central Scotland, and continually hoped to reach the east coast ports and the rich Fife coalfield. The North British Railway responded by promoting its own lines serving the areas thought to be of interest to the Caledonian, so as to be able to demonstrate to Parliament that they were adequately serving the districts. Kirkcaldy was known to be a Caledonian objective, and the North British obtained authorisation to build a line from near Alloa to Kilbagie and Kincardine. The line was opened on 18 December 1893.

The line ran from a few miles east of Alloa on the Dunfermline line, at a new junction called Kincardine Junction, through Clackmannan, Kilbagie, Kincardine, Culross, Torryburn and Cairneyhill to Elbowend Junction, where it joined the Charlestown branch line of the NBR. From there trains reached Comely Park station in Dunfermline (later Dunfermline Lower).

The Kincardine and Dunfermline Railway
A branch line to Kincardine was not enough to satisfy the demands for a better railway service in the area, and connecting Kincardine and Dunfermline was proposed. The Kincardine and Dunfermline Railway was the result, authorised by the North British Railway (General Powers) Act, 1898. It was to leave the Charlestown line at Meadowend and then run by Cairneyhill, Torryburn and Culross to meet the end of the existing Kincardine branch at Kincardine Pier.

Getting the Act kept the Caledonian Railway out, and actually constructing the railway was a lower priority. In fact the North British Railway had to apply for an extension of time to complete the line, in January 1903. The local authorities opposed the application, suspecting that the NBR had no intention of actually completing it. In fact the contract for the work was let in January 1904, and the line opened on 2 July 1906. The Meadowend to Elbowend section was on the alignment of the Elgin Railway of 1812, and from Meadowend to Lochymuir it was on the route of the 1783 waggonway.

The Fife Free Press reported the opening:
"A fairly large number of passengers travelled on the newly branch railway to and from Kincardine which was opened to traffic on Monday [2 June 1906]. In the morning train from Kincardine about eighty persons came to the Dunfermline Lower station."

but the same newspaper was pessimistic about the economic activity of the locality:

"The line passes through a district very rich in mineral, which only awaits development, and opens up a charming bit of country abounding in historical and antiquarian associations. At one time the district in direct touch with the new railway was very much busier than now, having in fact seen better days, but the opening of the new line, which commences by a junction with the Dunfermline and Charlestown branch at Elbowend, with stations at Torryburn, Culross, and Kincardine-on-Forth, may be expected to waken it into new life."

Four passenger trains ran each way daily, with a fifth on Saturdays; but two of the trains were short workings from Alloa to kincardine, so the new line only had two trains each way. The three intermediate stations were described as commodious. The passenger service was not well used, and it ceased from 7 July 1930.

After 1930
The goods service on the line was also poorly used, and it too closed in 1964. An unexpected revival took place when two large coal-fired electricity generating stations were built near the line: Kincardine power station opened in 1962, but has now closed (in 1990) and Longannet power station, opened in 1970. Both these power stations had a huge demand for coal, which was brought in by rail from the Dunfermline end, so that the eastern section of the route was re-opened. 
 
Changing patterns of coal delivery led to coal imported to Hunterston in Ayrshire being brought to Longannet from 2008, running via Alloa and the western end of the line, which is therefore now complete again.

Nonetheless, Kincardine power station has long been closed and Longannet closed on 24 March 2016, so that freight train use of the line appears now to have no long term future.

It has been proposed that this "enables" re-opening of the line to passenger traffic, extending from Alloa to Dunfermline. It is not clear at present whether this is viable.

Station list
 Kincardine Junction;
 Clackmannan & Kennet opened 18 December 1893; closed 7 July 1930; (Clackamnnan on the S&DR main line was renamed Clackmannan Road in 1893);
 Kilbagie; opened 7 September 1894; closed 7 July 1930;
 Kincardine; op 18 December 1893; closed 7 July 1930; Kincardine station on the main line was renamed Forest Mill 1893 and closed 22 Sep 1930;
 Culross; opened 2 July 1906; closed 7 July 1930;
 Valleyfield Platform; opened c1914 ; closed c1920;
 Torryburn; opened 2 July 1906; closed 7 July 1930;
 Cairneyhill; opened 2 July 1906; closed 7 July 1930;
 Elbowend Jn;
 Charlestown Jn.

Notes

References

Railway lines in Scotland
North British Railway
Railway lines opened in 1906
1906 establishments in Scotland